Giordano "Nando" Aldrighetti (14 November 1905 – 12 August 1939) was an Italian motorcycle racer and racing driver.

In 1938 he crashed heavily at the Swiss Grand Prix and was forced to retire from motorcycle racing due to his injuries.

He turned to car racing by joining the Alfa Corse team for 1939. Driving a Tipo 158, he competed in the Tripoli Grand Prix, where he retired. In August he was entered for the Coppa Acerbo, held at the Pescara Circuit in Italy. He crashed heavily in practice and was thrown out of his burning car; although he appeared to have survived the accident, he died that night from internal injuries.

References

1905 births
1939 deaths
Racing drivers from Milan
Racing drivers who died while racing
Sport deaths in Italy